David John Condon (born 6 July 1991) is an English field hockey player who plays as a midfielder or forward for Wimbledon and the England and Great Britain national teams.

Club career
He plays club hockey in the Men's England Hockey League Premier Division for Wimbledon.

International career
Condon competed for England in the men's hockey tournament at the 2014 Commonwealth Games where he won a bronze medal.

He also competed for England in the men's hockey tournament at the 2018 Commonwealth Games
where he won a bronze medal.

References

External links

Profile on England Hockey

1991 births
Living people
Commonwealth Games bronze medallists for England
English male field hockey players
2014 Men's Hockey World Cup players
Field hockey players at the 2014 Commonwealth Games
Field hockey players at the 2016 Summer Olympics
2018 Men's Hockey World Cup players
Olympic field hockey players of Great Britain
British male field hockey players
Sportspeople from Leicester
Commonwealth Games medallists in field hockey
Loughborough Students field hockey players
East Grinstead Hockey Club players
Men's England Hockey League players
2023 Men's FIH Hockey World Cup players
Medallists at the 2014 Commonwealth Games